Kepler-445b is an exoplanet orbiting the Red dwarf star Kepler-445 every 3 days.

References

Exoplanets discovered by the Kepler space telescope
Exoplanets discovered in 2015
Transiting exoplanets
Super-Earths

Cygnus (constellation)